Bolaang Mongondow Regency is a regency of North Sulawesi Province, Indonesia, situated on the island of Sulawesi. The principal town lies at Kotamobagu, which is now administratively separated from the regency, the administrative centre of which is now at the town of Lolak. The Regency covers an area of 2,871.65 km2, and had a population of 213,484 at the 2010 Census and 248,751 at the 2020 Census.

Administrative Districts 
At the time of the 2010 Census the Regency was divided into twelve districts (kecamatan), but three additional districts have subsequently been created by splitting of existing districts. The districts are tabulated below with their areas and their populations at the 2010 Census and the 2020 Census. The table also includes the location of the district administrative centres, the number of administrative villages (rural desa and urban kelurahan) in each district, and its postal codes.

Notes: (a) the populations at the 2010 Census of the communities now forming these three new districts are included in the figures for the existing districts from which they were cut out. (b) Lolak District includes the offshore islands of Pulau Molosing and Pulau Tikus, situated off the north coast. (c) Sangtompolang  District includes the offshore islands of Pulau Gogobola, Pulau Paniki, Pulau Tengah and Pulau Tudunya, all situated off the north coast.

Airport
A new airport was proposed in 2015 as a construction project located in Lolak town. The government allocated IDR250 billion (USD17.2 million) for the project. Construction was scheduled to commence in 2018 and complete by 2021. The airport originally will feature a 1400m runway, later to be extended to 2800m. The detailed airport planning envisages a runway both direction 10-28.

Climate
Lolak has a tropical rainforest climate (Af) with moderate rainfall from July to September and heavy rainfall in the remaining months.

References

Regencies of North Sulawesi